Hake, or Hakes, is a surname of English and Nordic origin, with Hakes being patronymic from Hake (Hakeson/Hakesonn).  The origins of Hake(s) are said to derive from the Old Norse word haki, which is cognate with the word 'hook' and given originally to someone in the fishing trade.    

The surname also derives from the Northern Germanic surname Haack, which is a name from Middle Low German hake.  The surname was first recorded in the eastern counties of England and originated under the pre-9th century Danish-Norwegian Viking influence.

List of persons with the surname

 Alan Hake, co-founder of Must Destroy Records
 Alfred Egmont Hake (1849–1916), English author and social thinker
 Edward Hake (fl. 1579), English satirist
 Herb Hake (born 1903), American author, cartoonist, radio, and television personality
 Thomas Gordon Hake (1809-1895), English poet

See also
 Hake, fish